The women's 4 × 100 metres relay event at the 2009 Asian Athletics Championships was held at the Guangdong Olympic Stadium on November 12–14.

Medalists 

* Athletes who participated in heats only.

Results

Heats

Final

References

Heats results
Final results

2009 Asian Athletics Championships
Relays at the Asian Athletics Championships
2009 in women's athletics